Jacques Bertin Nguemaleu (born 2 September 1989 in Yaoundé) is a Cameroonian football defender who plays for TTM Lopburi in the Thai Division 1 League.

Career
The central defender began his career in 2004 with Juvenile Academy FC and signed in 2005 for Union Douala who by 2009 named him as the main team captain. In summer 2009 Nguemaleu joined on loan Serbian SuperLiga side FK Napredak Kruševac.

National team
Nguemaleu was a member of the Cameroon team, that won the 2008 CEMAC Cup and played as well in the 2009 CEMAC Cup and the 2010 CEMAC Cup. He was also member of the Cameroon squad at the 2011 African Nations Championship having played all 3 group matches and the quarter-finals match against where they lost with Angola in a penalty shout-out with Nguemaleu scoring one of Cameroon's penalties.

He was also part of the Cameroon team participating in the 2011 All-Africa Games where his team finished in third place in the tournament. He made 4 appearances.

References

Living people
1989 births
Footballers from Yaoundé
Cameroonian footballers
Cameroon international footballers
Cameroonian expatriate footballers
2011 African Nations Championship players
Association football defenders
Union Douala players
FK Napredak Kruševac players
Expatriate footballers in Serbia
Expatriate footballers in Thailand
African Games bronze medalists for Cameroon
African Games medalists in football
Competitors at the 2011 All-Africa Games
Cameroon A' international footballers
Cameroonian expatriate sportspeople in Serbia
Cameroonian expatriate sportspeople in Thailand